Political correctness (adjectivally politically correct; commonly abbreviated PC) is a term used to describe language, policies, or measures that are intended to avoid offense or disadvantage to members of particular groups in society. Since the late 1980s, the term has been used to describe a preference for inclusive language and avoidance of language or behavior that can be seen as excluding, marginalizing, or insulting to groups of people disadvantaged or discriminated against, particularly groups defined by ethnicity, sex, gender, or sexual orientation. In public discourse and the media, the term is generally used as a pejorative with an implication that these policies are excessive or unwarranted.

The phrase politically correct first appeared in the 1930s, when it was used to describe dogmatic adherence to ideology in authoritarian regimes, such as Nazi Germany and Soviet Russia. Early usage of the term politically correct by leftists in the 1970s and 1980s was as self-critical satire; usage was ironic, rather than a name for a serious political movement. It was considered an in-joke among leftists used to satirise those who were too rigid in their adherence to political orthodoxy. The modern pejorative usage of the term emerged from conservative criticism of the New Left in the late 20th century, with many describing it as a form of censorship.

Commentators on the political left in the United States contend that conservatives use the concept of political correctness to downplay and divert attention from substantively discriminatory behavior against disadvantaged groups. They also argue that the political right enforces its own forms of political correctness to suppress criticism of its favored constituencies and ideologies. In the United States, the term has played a major role in the culture war between liberals and conservatives.

History

Early-to-mid 20th century 

In the early-to-mid 20th century, the phrase politically correct was used to describe strict adherence to a range of ideological orthodoxies within politics. In 1934, The New York Times reported that Nazi Germany was granting reporting permits "only to pure 'Aryans' whose opinions are politically correct". 

The term political correctness  first appeared in Marxist–Leninist vocabulary following the Russian Revolution of 1917. At that time, it was used to describe strict adherence to the policies and principles of the Communist Party of the Soviet Union, that is, the party line. Later in the United States, the phrase came to be associated with accusations of dogmatism in debates between communists and socialists. According to American educator Herbert Kohl, writing about debates in New York in the late 1940s and early 1950s.

1970s 

In the 1970s, the American New Left began using the term politically correct. In the essay The Black Woman: An Anthology (1970), Toni Cade Bambara said that "a man cannot be politically correct and a [male] chauvinist, too." William Safire records this as the first use in the typical modern sense. The term "political correctness" was believed to have been revived by the New Left through familiarity in the West with Mao's Little Red Book, in which Mao stressed holding to the correct party line. The term rapidly began to be used by the New Left in an ironic or self-deprecating sense.

Thereafter, the term was often used as self-critical satire. Debra L. Shultz said that "throughout the 1970s and 1980s, the New Left, feminists, and progressives... used their term 'politically correct' ironically, as a guard against their own orthodoxy in social change efforts." PC is used in the comic book Merton of the Movement, by Bobby London, which was followed by the term ideologically sound, in the comic strips of Bart Dickon. In her essay "Toward a feminist Revolution" (1992) Ellen Willis said: "In the early eighties, when feminists used the term 'political correctness', it was used to refer sarcastically to the anti-pornography movement's efforts to define a 'feminist sexuality'."

Stuart Hall suggests one way in which the original use of the term may have developed into the modern one:

The term probably entered  use in the modern sense in the United Kingdom around 1975.

1980s and 1990s 
Allan Bloom's The Closing of the American Mind, a book first published in 1987, heralded a debate about "political correctness" in American higher education in the 1980s and 1990s. Professor of English literary and cultural studies at CMU Jeffrey J. Williams wrote that the "assault on ... political correctness that simmered through the Reagan years, gained bestsellerdom with Bloom's Closing of the American Mind." According to Z.F. Gamson, Bloom's book "attacked the faculty for 'political correctness'". Prof. of Social Work at CSU Tony Platt says the "campaign against 'political correctness'" was launched by Bloom's book in 1987.

An October 1990 New York Times article by Richard Bernstein is credited with popularizing the term. At this time, the term was mainly being used within academia: "Across the country the term p.c., as it is commonly abbreviated, is being heard more and more in debates over what should be taught at the universities". Nexis citations in "arcnews/curnews" reveal only seventy total citations in articles to "political correctness" for 1990; but one year later, Nexis records 1,532 citations, with a steady increase to more than 7,000 citations by 1994. In May 1991, The New York Times had a follow-up article, according to which the term was increasingly being used in a wider public arena:

The previously obscure far-left term became common currency in the lexicon of the conservative social and political challenges against progressive teaching methods and curriculum changes in the secondary schools and universities of the U.S. Policies, behavior, and speech codes that the speaker or the writer regarded as being the imposition of a liberal orthodoxy, were described and criticized as "politically correct". In May 1991, at a commencement ceremony for a graduating class of the University of Michigan, then U.S. President George H. W. Bush used the term in his speech: "The notion of political correctness has ignited controversy across the land. And although the movement arises from the laudable desire to sweep away the debris of racism and sexism and hatred, it replaces old prejudice with new ones. It declares certain topics off-limits, certain expression off-limits, even certain gestures off-limits."

After 1991, its use as a pejorative phrase became widespread amongst conservatives in the US. It became a key term encapsulating conservative concerns about the left in cultural and political debates extending beyond academia. Two articles on the topic in late 1990 in Forbes and Newsweek both used the term "thought police" in their headlines, exemplifying the tone of the new usage, but it was Dinesh D'Souza's Illiberal Education: The Politics of Race and Sex on Campus (1991) which "captured the press's imagination". Similar critical terminology was used by D'Souza for a range of policies in academia around victimization, supporting multiculturalism through affirmative action, sanctions against anti-minority hate speech, and revising curricula (sometimes referred to as "canon busting"). These trends were at least in part a response to multiculturalism and the rise of identity politics, with movements such as feminism, gay rights movements and ethnic minority movements. That response received funding from conservative foundations and think tanks such as the John M. Olin Foundation, which funded several books such as D'Souza's.

Herbert Kohl, in 1992, commented that a number of neoconservatives who promoted the use of the term "politically correct" in the early 1990s were former Communist Party members, and, as a result, familiar with the Marxist use of the phrase. He argued that in doing so, they intended "to insinuate that egalitarian democratic ideas are actually authoritarian, orthodox, and Communist-influenced, when they oppose the right of people to be racist, sexist, and homophobic".

During the 1990s, conservative and right-wing politicians, think tanks, and speakers adopted the phrase as a pejorative descriptor of their ideological enemies, especially in the context of the culture wars about language and the content of public-school curricula. Roger Kimball, in Tenured Radicals, endorsed Frederick Crews's view that PC is best described as "Left Eclecticism", a term defined by Kimball as "any of a wide variety of anti-establishment modes of thought from structuralism and poststructuralism, deconstruction, and Lacanian analyst to feminist, homosexual, black, and other patently political forms of criticism".

Liberal commentators have argued that the conservatives and reactionaries who used the term did so in an effort to divert political discussion away from the substantive matters of resolving societal discrimination, such as racial, social class, gender, and legal inequality, against people whom conservatives do not consider part of the social mainstream. Jan Narveson wrote that "that phrase was born to live between scare-quotes: it suggests that the operative considerations in the area so called are merely political, steamrolling the genuine reasons of principle for which we ought to be acting..." Commenting in 2001, one such British journalist, Polly Toynbee, said "the phrase is an empty, right-wing smear, designed only to elevate its user", and in 2010 she wrote "the phrase 'political correctness' was born as a coded cover for all who still want to say Paki, spastic, or queer". Another British journalist, Will Hutton, wrote in 2001:

Glenn Loury wrote in 1994 that to address the subject of "political correctness" when power and authority within the academic community is being contested by parties on either side of that issue, is to invite scrutiny of one's arguments by would-be "friends" and "enemies". Combatants from the left and the right will try to assess whether a writer is "for them" or "against them". Geoffrey Hughes suggested that debate over political correctness concerns whether changing language actually solves political and social problems, with critics viewing it less about solving problems than imposing censorship, intellectual intimidation and demonstrating the moral purity of those who practice it. Hughes also argues that political correctness tends to be pushed by a minority rather than an organic form of language change.

Usage 

The modern pejorative usage of the term emerged from conservative criticism of the New Left in the late 20th century. This usage was popularized by a number of articles in The New York Times and other media throughout the 1990s, and was widely used in the debate surrounding Allan Bloom's 1987 book The Closing of the American Mind.  The term gained further currency in response to Roger Kimball's Tenured Radicals (1990), and conservative author Dinesh D'Souza's 1991 book Illiberal Education. Supporters of politically correct language have been pejoratively referred to as the "language police".

Education 
Modern debate on the term was sparked by conservative critiques of perceived liberal bias in academia and education, and conservatives have since used it as a major line of attack. Similarly, a common conservative criticism of higher education in the United States is that the political views of teaching staff are more liberal than those of the general population, and that this contributes to an atmosphere of political correctness. William Deresiewicz defines political correctness as an attempt to silence "unwelcome beliefs and ideas", arguing that it is largely the result of for-profit education, as campus faculty and staff are wary of angering students upon whose fees they depend.

Preliminary research published in 2020 indicated that students at a large U.S. public university generally felt instructors were open-minded and encouraged free expression of diverse viewpoints; nonetheless, most students worried about the consequences of voicing their political opinions, with "[a]nxieties about expressing political views and self-censorship ... more prevalent among students who identify as conservative".

As a conspiracy theory 

Some conservative commentators in the West argue that "political correctness" and multiculturalism are part of a conspiracy with the ultimate goal of undermining Judeo-Christian values. This theory, which holds that political correctness originates from the critical theory of the Frankfurt School as part of a conspiracy that its proponents call "Cultural Marxism". The theory originated with Michael Minnicino's 1992 essay "New Dark Age: Frankfurt School and 'Political Correctness'", published in a Lyndon LaRouche movement journal. In 2001, conservative commentator Patrick Buchanan wrote in The Death of the West that "political correctness is cultural Marxism", and that "its trademark is intolerance".

Media 

In the US, the term has been widely used in books and journals, but in Britain the usage has been confined mainly to the popular press. Many such authors and popular-media figures, particularly on the right, have used the term to criticize what they see as bias in the media. William McGowan argues that journalists get stories wrong or ignore stories worthy of coverage, because of what McGowan perceives to be their liberal ideologies and their fear of offending minority groups. Robert Novak, in his essay "Political Correctness Has No Place in the Newsroom", used the term to blame newspapers for adopting language use policies that he thinks tend to excessively avoid the appearance of bias. He argued that political correctness in language not only destroys meaning but also demeans the people who are meant to be protected.

Authors David Sloan and Emily Hoff claim that in the US, journalists shrug off concerns about political correctness in the newsroom, equating the political correctness criticisms with the old "liberal media bias" label. According to author John Wilson, left-wing forces of "political correctness" have been blamed for unrelated censorship, with Time citing campaigns against violence on network television in the US as contributing to a "mainstream culture [that] has become cautious, sanitized, scared of its own shadow" because of "the watchful eye of the p.c. police", protests and advertiser boycotts targeting TV shows are generally organized by right-wing religious groups campaigning against violence, sex, and depictions of homosexuality on television.

Satirical use 
Political correctness is often satirized, for example in The PC Manifesto (1992) by Saul Jerushalmy and Rens Zbignieuw X, and Politically Correct Bedtime Stories (1994) by James Finn Garner, which presents fairy tales re-written from an exaggerated politically correct perspective. In 1994, the comedy film PCU took a look at political correctness on a college campus. Other examples include the television program Politically Incorrect, George Carlin's "Euphemisms" routine, and The Politically Correct Scrapbook. The popularity of the South Park cartoon program led to the creation of the term "South Park Republican" by Andrew Sullivan, and later the book South Park Conservatives by Brian C. Anderson. In its Season 19 (2015), South Park introduced the character PC Principal, who embodies the principle, to poke fun at the principle of political correctness.

The Colbert Report'''s host Stephen Colbert often talked, satirically, about the "PC Police".

 Science 

Groups who oppose certain generally accepted scientific views about evolution, second-hand tobacco smoke, AIDS, global warming, race and other politically contentious scientific matters have used the term "political correctness" to describe what they view as unwarranted rejection of their perspective on these issues by a scientific community that they believe has been corrupted by liberal politics.

Right-wing political correctness
"Political correctness" is a label typically used to describe liberal or left-wing terms and actions but rarely used for analogous attempts to mold language and behavior on the right. In 2012, economist Paul Krugman wrote that "the big threat to our discourse is right-wing political correctness, which – unlike the liberal version – has lots of power and money behind it. And the goal is very much the kind of thing Orwell tried to convey with his notion of Newspeak: to make it impossible to talk, and possibly even think, about ideas that challenge the established order." Alex Nowrasteh of the Cato Institute referred to the right's own version of political correctness as "patriotic correctness".

 See also 

 
 
 
 
 
 
 
 
 
 
 
 
 
 
 
 
 
 
 
 
 
 
 Politics and the English Language 1946 essay by George Orwell
 
 
 
 
 
 
 
 
 
 

 Notes 

 References 

 Further reading 

 Bernstein, David E. (2003). You Can't Say That! The Growing Threat to Civil Liberties from Antidiscrimination Laws. Cato Institute, 180 pages. .
 Hentoff, Nat (1992). Free Speech for Me – But Not for Thee. HarperCollins. .
 Schlesinger, Jr., Arthur M. (1998). The Disuniting of America: Reflections on a Multicultural Society. W.W. Norton, revised edition. .
 Debra L. Schultz (1993). To Reclaim a Legacy of Diversity: Analyzing the "Political Correctness" Debates in Higher Education. New York: National Council for Research on Women. .
 John Wilson (1995). The Myth of Political Correctness: The Conservative Attack on High Education.'' Durham, North Carolina: Duke University Press. .

External links 

 

 
Political slurs
Political terminology
Sociolinguistics